Fraubrunnen District was one of the 26 administrative districts in the canton of Bern, Switzerland. Its capital was the municipality of Fraubrunnen. The district had an area of 124 km² and consisted of 27 municipalities.  It was dissolved on 1 January 2010 as part of a reorganization of the districts of the Canton.  Much of the district became part of the new Emmental district.

 Population is as of December 2007, includes population and area of Ballmoos which merged into Jegenstorf in 2010

References

Former districts of the canton of Bern